Motamedabad (also Romanized as Mo‘tamedābād; also known as Majīdābād) is a village in Solgi Rural District, Khezel District, Nahavand County, Hamadan Province, Iran. At the 2006 census, its population was 125, in 33 families.

References 

Populated places in Nahavand County